Hubert C. Kessels was an economist and a governor of the Bank of Ghana. He served as governor of the bank from 21 August 1959 to 8 September 1962.

References

 

Governors of Bank of Ghana
Ghanaian economists